Ariadna Nevado Gimeno (born 26 September 2000) is a Spanish professional racing cyclist, who last rode for the UCI Women's Team  during the 2019 women's road cycling season.

References

External links

2000 births
Living people
Spanish female cyclists
Place of birth missing (living people)
21st-century Spanish women